Aphis genistae is an aphid of the family Aphididae.

Distribution
This species can be found in most of Europe eastward to Ukraine and Turkey, and in the Nearctic realm (it has been introduced to North America).

Description
Apterae are black, coated with wax meal, while alatae have 4-8 secondary rhinaria.

Biology
These insects mainly feed on small branches and flowers of Genista anglica, Genista lydia and Genista tinctoria (hence the species name), but they have also been collected on Laburnum, Cytisus, Petteria, Spartium and Sophora species. These aphids sometimes have a mutualistic relationship with ants. They are holocyclic (sex is involved, leading to egg production) and oviparae. Sexual females mate with the alate males in September to produce overwintering eggs.

Bibliography

 Kaltenbach (1843), Monographie der Familien der Pflanzenläuse (Phytophthires), P. Fagot, Aachen 222 pp

References

External links
 Les Hemipteres du Quebec

genistae
Insects described in 1763
Taxa named by Giovanni Antonio Scopoli